(Via Panisperna Boys) is an Italian movie by director Gianni Amelio, telling the enthusiasms, fears, joys and disappointments of the (private and professional) life of a well-known group of young men fond of physics and mathematics, who just made history as the Via Panisperna boys.

The movie derives from a 3-hour long TV movie, which was produced and broadcast in two parts by RAI in 1990.

Plot
The story is inspired by a real life fact and set in the 1930s when, at the Institute of Physics of Via Panisperna, in Rome, physicist Enrico Fermi managed to involve a group of brilliant young students—Emilio, Bruno, Edoardo and Ettore (all of whom became famous scientists)—forming a working group committed to scientific research who would achieve great discoveries in the field of nuclear physics.

These young men's lives—full of anxieties as well as enthusiasms—are related with pathos and sensitiveness, mainly looking at their private side, with their youthful energies, but also their fears and weakness.

The story has among the main themes the relationship between Enrico and Ettore, the former becoming both a sort of father and of elder brother to Ettore, with the typical disputes (misunderstandings hiding affection) happening in a family. Unfortunately, the fascist political regime, the racial laws, Ettore's disappearance into nowhere (suspicious death or suicide, it will never be known)—he who already realized how their exciting discoveries could become powerful destruction weapons in wrong hands (attentively see the scene set in Sicilian fields)—all proves to be more decisive than the love for physics which had drawn them together so much and, finally, the boys turn different ways.

Cast
Andrea Prodan as Ettore Majorana
Ennio Fantastichini as Enrico Fermi
Michele Melega as  Franco, assistant of Fermi
Giovanni Romani as Edoardo Amaldi
Alberto Gimignani as Emilio Segrè
Giorgio Dal Piaz as Bruno Pontecorvo
Laura Morante  as Laura, wife of Fermi
Cristina Marsillach as cousin of Majorana
Mario Adorf as Orso Mario Corbino
Virna Lisi as  mother of Majorana
Sabina Guzzanti as Ginestra, lover of Amaldi
Georges Géret as Francese

See also
Via Panisperna boys, the group of young men that gathered around Enrico Fermi in real life.
 List of Italian films of 1989
Gianni Amelio

External links

1989 films
1989 drama films
Italian drama films
Films set in Italy
Films set in Rome
1980s Italian-language films
Films directed by Gianni Amelio
Films scored by Riz Ortolani
Films with screenplays by Vincenzo Cerami
Films about nuclear war and weapons
Biographical films about scientists
Films set in the 1930s
Enrico Fermi
1980s Italian films